Paul Radisich (born 9 October 1962, in Auckland) is a retired New Zealand racing driver and businessman of Croat origin. He has competed in saloon cars for many years — both European-style tourers and the V8 Supercars of Australia and New Zealand.

Early Years
In 1983 he was Formula Atlantic runner-up, earning the prestigious Driver To Europe award. In 1985 and 1986 he raced in British Formula 3, alongside Damon Hill. He later raced in Indy Lights and Formula Super Vee with some success, before finishing second in the 1990 Bathurst 1000. This led him towards racing saloon cars full-time.

European Touring Cars

He won the 1993 and 1994 Touring Car World Cup events at Monza and at Donington respectively. 1993 was his first British Touring Car Championship (BTCC) season, in a Ford Mondeo prepared by Andy Rouse. He finished 3rd in the series despite only competing in half the year. He would again drive for Andy Rouse in 1994 where he finished 3rd again behind Gabriele Tarquini for Alfa Romeo and Alain Menu for Renault. Radisich would again drive for Andy Rouse in 1995 but by the end of the 1995 season the car had reached the end of its development cycle and was increasingly uncompetitive during the end of the 1995 season and in the 1996 season when West Surrey Racing took over the Ford team from Andy Rouse. 1996 would be a disappointment for the Ford team with no podium places and Radisich finishing 13th in the championship. 1997 would see a new Mondeo however it too was uncompetitive, and would not challenge the front running teams. In 1998 he raced for Peugeot where he again had a disappointing season. He left the series and went to race for Dick Johnson Racing in the V8 Supercar series in Australia.

At the end of the 2004 season, Radisich entered the BTCC Masters event at Donington, and was considering a comeback to the BTCC the following year, but he instead chose to continue his racing career down under.

V8 Supercars

In 1999 he joined Dick Johnson Racing replacing the departed John Bowe.  He remained with Dick Johnson Racing until the end of 2002.  In 2003 he joined Briggs Motor Sport which was later sold to British outfit Triple Eight Race Engineering in 2004.  In total he has three race wins and eight other podium results in the championship.

Team Kiwi Racing
He surprised a lot of people by signing for the patriotic Team Kiwi Racing for 2 years in 2005 racing in a Holden for the first time, helping the team to their first ever podium finish at Shanghai International Circuit in China, (third).  He finished the 2005 season in 14th place, TKR's highest ever finish in a Supercar season.

In the 2006 Supercheap Auto 1000 endurance race at Mount Panorama he had a major crash at around 200 km/h in The Chase.  While attempting to overtake Nathan Pretty he ran wide into the dirt and could not brake in time and careered into a tyre wall head on, flipping the car onto its side.  Rescue teams had to cut the roof off the car in order to get him out. He was then taken to a nearby hospital and then flown to a hospital in Sydney for further scans. He broke his ankle and sternum in the crash and missed the remainder of the season.

In November 2006 it was confirmed that Radisich had signed for a further 2 years with TKR and would once again be back racing in a Ford for 2007–08.  He has commented that he has unfinished business in V8 Supercars.

Paul returned to the cockpit at Barbagallo for the first time since Bathurst, to the delight of many fans.  He had a very good result at Pukekohe, the final round to be held at that circuit, finishing 7th in the third race.

Ford Performance Racing terminated its contract to supply and service the TKR Falcon on 31 May 2007. Paul Radisich said he had terminated his contract with TKR following the team's fallout with Ford Performance Racing that ran the car on behalf of TKR.
"TKR is in breach of contract and I have therefore terminated my contract with immediate effect."

Toll HSV Dealer Team
The New Zealand international joined fellow Kiwi Craig Baird and regular drivers Rick Kelly and Garth Tander in the Toll HSV ranks for the big endurance races in September and October.

The formal announcement was put on hold until Carrera Cup star and Bathurst rookie David Reynolds was signed and sealed with Super Cheap Auto Racing for the enduros. Reynolds had been in line for a drive with Toll HSV in the big races in September and October, but was happy to transfer to Super Cheap for his V8 Supercar debut without the potential pressure of a fellow drivers championship hanging over him.

At Sandown, Paul was paired with Championship front-runner, Rick Kelly. The car was qualified by Rick Kelly, and they started from 8th position on the grid. Paul and Rick Kelly drove the Number 1 Toll HSV Commodore to 2nd place, 2.8 seconds behind Triple Eight Racing's Craig Lowndes and Jamie Whincup.

At Bathurst, Paul was paired with Craig Baird. After qualifying 9th after the top-10 shootout, Paul and Craig Baird started strongly, and were running on the fringe of top 10 for the majority of the race, slowed by persistent braking problems which also afflicted their more illustrious team-mates. Ultimately, the team withdrew from the race on lap 137 of 161 so as not to risk damaging Tander and Kelly's race cars for the championship battle to come.

Retirement and later career
Returning to the team in 2008, Radisich crashed heavily during practice for the 2008 Bathurst 1000, after the throttle jammed open at McPhillamy Park Corner, hitting the concrete wall in a gap in the tyre barriers. Radisich fractured both ankles, reopened the fractured sternum sustained in an accident two years prior, fractured lumbar and thoracic vertebrae, cracked ribs and suffered bruising to his lungs. His recovery has been protracted and brought an end his motor racing career.

Paul raced a Ford Mustang S550 in the invitational non-championship Class Three of the 2018-19 BNT V8 Championship

He was team manager of the Super Black Racing team until the team was disbanded at the end of the 2016 season. He is managing director of New Zealand oil company Aegis Oil, a company founded by his father Frank.

Paul is the in-studio co-host of the British Touring Car Championship segment of TV3's CRC Motorsport with Shaun Summerfield.

Career results

Complete World Touring Car Championship results
(key) (Races in bold indicate pole position) (Races in italics indicate fastest lap)

† Not eligible for points.

Complete Asia-Pacific Touring Car Championship results
(key) (Races in bold indicate pole position) (Races in italics indicate fastest lap)

Complete British Touring Car Championship results
(key) (Races in bold indicate pole position - 1 point awarded all races 1996 onwards) (Races in italics indicate fastest lap) (* signifies that driver lead feature race for at least one lap - 1 point awarded 1998 only)

† Not eligible for points due to being an endurance driver.

‡ Endurance driver.

Complete Japanese Touring Car Championship results
(key) (Races in bold indicate pole position) (Races in italics indicate fastest lap)

Complete V8 Supercar Championship results

Complete Bathurst 1000 results

* Super Touring race

References

People educated at Liston College
Supercars Championship drivers
New Zealand racing drivers
1962 births
British Touring Car Championship drivers
Indy Lights drivers
Atlantic Championship drivers
SCCA Formula Super Vee drivers
Trans-Am Series drivers
New Zealand people of Croatian descent
Sportspeople from Auckland
Living people
Porsche Carrera Cup GB drivers
New Zealand Formula Pacific Championship drivers
Australian Endurance Championship drivers
Peugeot Sport drivers
Dick Johnson Racing drivers
Japanese Touring Car Championship drivers